Jean Désiré Gustave Courbet (10 June 1819 – 31 December 1877) was a French painter who led the Realism movement in 19th-century French painting. Committed to painting only what he could see, he rejected academic convention and the Romanticism of the previous generation of visual artists. His independence set an example that was important to later artists, such as the Impressionists and the Cubists. Courbet occupies an important place in 19th-century French painting as an innovator and as an artist willing to make bold social statements through his work.

Courbet's paintings of the late 1840s and early 1850s brought him his first recognition. They challenged convention by depicting unidealized peasants and workers, often on a grand scale traditionally reserved for paintings of religious or historical subjects. Courbet's subsequent paintings were mostly of a less overtly political character: landscapes, seascapes, hunting scenes, nudes, and still lifes. Courbet, a socialist, was active in the political developments of France. He was imprisoned for six months in 1871 for his involvement with the Paris Commune and lived in exile in Switzerland from 1873 until his death four years later.

Biography 

Gustave Courbet was born in 1819 to Régis and Sylvie Oudot Courbet in Ornans (department of Doubs). Anti-monarchical feelings prevailed in the household. (His maternal grandfather fought in the French Revolution.) Courbet's sisters, Zoé, Zélie, and Juliette were his first models for drawing and painting. After moving to Paris he often returned home to Ornans to hunt, fish, and find inspiration.

Courbet went to Paris in 1839 and worked at the studio of Steuben and Hesse. An independent spirit, he soon left, preferring to develop his own style by studying the paintings of Spanish, Flemish and French masters in the Louvre, and painting copies of their work.

Courbet's first works were an Odalisque inspired by the writing of Victor Hugo and a Lélia illustrating George Sand, but he soon abandoned literary influences, choosing instead to base his paintings on observed reality. Among his paintings of the early 1840s are several self-portraits, Romantic in conception, in which the artist portrayed himself in various roles. These include Self-Portrait with Black Dog (c. 1842–44, accepted for exhibition at the 1844 Paris Salon), the theatrical Self-Portrait which is also known as Desperate Man (c. 1843–45), Lovers in the Countryside (1844, Musée des Beaux-Arts, Lyon), The Sculptor (1845), The Wounded Man (1844–54, Musée d'Orsay, Paris), The Cellist, Self-Portrait (1847, Nationalmuseum, Stockholm, shown at the 1848 Salon), and Man with a Pipe (1848–49, Musée Fabre, Montpellier).

Trips to the Netherlands and Belgium in 1846–47 strengthened Courbet's belief that painters should portray the life around them, as Rembrandt, Hals and other Dutch masters had. By 1848, he had gained supporters among the younger critics, the Neo-romantics and Realists, notably Champfleury.

Courbet achieved his first Salon success in 1849 with his painting After Dinner at Ornans. The work, reminiscent of Chardin and Le Nain, earned Courbet a gold medal and was purchased by the state. The gold medal meant that his works would no longer require jury approval for exhibition at the Salon—an exemption Courbet enjoyed until 1857 (when the rule changed).

In 1849–50, Courbet painted The Stone Breakers (destroyed in the Allied Bombing of Dresden in 1945), which Proudhon admired as an icon of peasant life; it has been called "the first of his great works". The painting was inspired by a scene Courbet witnessed on the roadside. He later explained to Champfleury and the writer Francis Wey: "It is not often that one encounters so complete an expression of poverty and so, right then and there I got the idea for a painting. I told them to come to my studio the next morning."

Realism 

Courbet's work belonged neither to the predominant Romantic nor Neoclassical schools. History painting, which the Paris Salon esteemed as a painter's highest calling, did not interest him, for he believed that "the artists of one century [are] basically incapable of reproducing the aspect of a past or future century ..." Instead, he maintained that the only possible source for living art is the artist's own experience. He and Jean-François Millet would find inspiration painting the life of peasants and workers.

Courbet painted figurative compositions, landscapes, seascapes, and still lifes. He courted controversy by addressing social issues in his work, and by painting subjects that were considered vulgar, such as the rural bourgeoisie, peasants, and working conditions of the poor. His work, along with that of Honoré Daumier and Jean-François Millet, became known as Realism. For Courbet realism dealt not with the perfection of line and form, but entailed spontaneous and rough handling of paint, suggesting direct observation by the artist while portraying the irregularities in nature. He depicted the harshness of life, and in doing so challenged contemporary academic ideas of art. One of the distinctive features of Courbet's Realism was his lifelong attachment to his native province, the Franche-Comté, and of his birthplace, Ornans.

The Stone Breakers

Considered to be the first of Courbet's great works, The Stone Breakers of 1849 is an example of social realism that caused a sensation when it was first exhibited at the Paris Salon in 1850. The work was based on two men, one young and one old, whom Courbet discovered engaged in backbreaking labor on the side of the road when he returned to Ornans for an eight-month visit in October 1848. On his inspiration, Courbet told his friends and art critics Francis Wey and Jules Champfleury, "It is not often that one encounters so complete an expression of poverty and so, right then and there I got the idea for a painting."

While other artists had depicted the plight of the rural poor, Courbet's peasants are not idealized like those in works such as Breton's The Gleaners.

In February 1945, the work was destroyed during World War II, along with 154 other pictures, when a transport vehicle moving the pictures to the castle of Königstein, near Dresden, was bombed by Allied forces.

A Burial at Ornans 

The Salon of 1850–1851 found him triumphant with The Stone Breakers, the Peasants of Flagey and A Burial at Ornans. The Burial, one of Courbet's most important works, records the funeral of his grand uncle which he attended in September 1848. People who attended the funeral were the models for the painting. Previously, models had been used as actors in historical narratives, but in Burial Courbet said he "painted the very people who had been present at the interment, all the townspeople". The result is a realistic presentation of them and life in Ornans.

According to art historian Sarah Faunce, "In Paris, the Burial was judged as a work that had thrust itself into the grand tradition of history painting, like an upstart in dirty boots crashing a genteel party, and in terms of that tradition it was, of course, found wanting." The painting lacks the sentimental rhetoric that was expected in a genre work: Courbet's mourners make no theatrical gestures of grief, and their faces seemed more caricatured than ennobled. The critics accused Courbet of a deliberate pursuit of ugliness.

Eventually, the public grew more interested in the new Realist approach, and the lavish, decadent fantasy of Romanticism lost popularity. Courbet well understood the importance of the painting, and said of it, "Burial at Ornans was in reality the burial of romanticism."

Courbet became a celebrity and was spoken of as a genius, a "terrible socialist" and a "savage". He actively encouraged the public's perception of him as an unschooled peasant, while his ambition, his bold pronouncements to journalists, and his insistence on depicting his own life in his art gave him a reputation for unbridled vanity.

Courbet associated his ideas of realism in art with political anarchism, and, having gained an audience, he promoted democratic and socialist ideas by writing politically motivated essays and dissertations. His familiar visage was the object of frequent caricature in the popular French press.

In 1850, Courbet wrote to a friend:

During the 1850s, Courbet painted numerous figurative works using common folk and friends as his subjects, such as Village Damsels (1852), The Wrestlers (1853), The Bathers (1853), The Sleeping Spinner (1853), and The Wheat Sifters (1854).

The Artist's Studio 

In 1855, Courbet submitted fourteen paintings for exhibition at the Exposition Universelle. Three were rejected for lack of space, including A Burial at Ornans and his other monumental canvas The Artist's Studio. Refusing to be denied, Courbet took matters into his own hands. He displayed forty of his paintings, including The Artist's Studio, in his gallery called The Pavilion of Realism (Pavillon du Réalisme) which was a temporary structure that he erected next door to the official Salon-like Exposition Universelle.

The work is an allegory of Courbet's life as a painter, seen as a heroic venture, in which he is flanked by friends and admirers on the right, and challenges and opposition to the left. Friends on the right include the art critics Champfleury, and Charles Baudelaire, and art collector Alfred Bruyas. On the left are figures (priest, prostitute, grave digger, merchant, and others) who represent what Courbet described in a letter to Champfleury as "the other world of trivial life, the people, misery, poverty, wealth, the exploited and the exploiters, the people who live off death."

In the foreground of the left-hand side is a man with dogs, who was not mentioned in Courbet's letter to Champfleury. X-rays show he was painted later, but his role in the painting is important: he is an allegory of the then-current French Emperor, Napoleon III, identified by his famous hunting dogs and iconic twirled mustache. By placing him on the left, Courbet publicly shows his disdain for the emperor and depicts him as a criminal, suggesting that his "ownership" of France is an illegal one.

Although artists like Eugène Delacroix were ardent champions of his effort, the public went to the show mostly out of curiosity and to deride him. Attendance and sales were disappointing, but Courbet's status as a hero to the French avant-garde became assured. He was admired by the American James Abbott McNeill Whistler, and he became an inspiration to the younger generation of French artists including Édouard Manet and the Impressionist painters. The Artist's Studio was recognized as a masterpiece by Delacroix, Baudelaire, and Champfleury, if not by the public.

Realist manifesto 
Courbet wrote a Realist manifesto for the introduction to the catalogue of this independent, personal exhibition, echoing the tone of the period's political manifestos. In it, he asserts his goal as an artist is "to translate the customs, the ideas, the appearance of my epoch according to my own estimation."

Notoriety 

In the Salon of 1857, Courbet showed six paintings. These included Young Ladies on the Banks of the Seine (Summer), depicting two prostitutes under a tree, as well as the first of many hunting scenes Courbet was to paint during the remainder of his life: Hind at Bay in the Snow and The Quarry.

Young Ladies on the Banks of the Seine, painted in 1856, provoked a scandal. Art critics accustomed to conventional, "timeless" nude women in landscapes were shocked by Courbet's depiction of modern women casually displaying their undergarments.

By exhibiting sensational works alongside hunting scenes, of the sort that had brought popular success to the English painter Edwin Landseer, Courbet guaranteed himself "both notoriety and sales". During the 1860s, Courbet painted a series of increasingly erotic works such as Femme nue couchée.

This culminated in The Origin of the World (L'Origine du monde) (1866), which depicts female genitalia and was not publicly exhibited until 1988, and Sleep (1866), featuring two women in bed. The latter painting became the subject of a police report when it was exhibited by a picture dealer in 1872.

Until about 1861, Napoléon's regime had exhibited authoritarian characteristics, using press censorship to prevent the spread of opposition, manipulating elections, and depriving Parliament of the right to free debate or any real power. In the 1860s, however, Napoléon III made more concessions to placate his liberal opponents. This change began by allowing free debates in Parliament and public reports of parliamentary debates. Press censorship, too, was relaxed and culminated in the appointment of the Liberal Émile Ollivier, previously a leader of the opposition to Napoléon's regime, as the de facto Prime Minister in 1870. As a sign of appeasement to the Liberals who admired Courbet, Napoleon III nominated him to the Legion of Honour in 1870. His refusal of the cross of the Legion of Honour angered those in power but made him immensely popular with those who opposed the prevailing regime.

Courbet and the Paris Commune 

On 4 September 1870, during the Franco-Prussian War, Courbet made a proposal that later came back to haunt him. He wrote a letter to the Government of National Defense, proposing that the column in the Place Vendôme, erected by Napoleon I to honour the victories of the French Army, be taken down. He wrote:

 Courbet proposed that the Column be moved to a more appropriate place, such as the Hotel des Invalides, a military hospital. He also wrote an open letter addressed to the German Army and to German artists, proposing that German and French cannons should be melted down and crowned with a liberty cap, and made into a new monument on Place Vendôme, dedicated to the federation of the German and French people. The Government of National Defense did nothing about his suggestion to tear down the column, but it was not forgotten.

On 18 March, in the aftermath of the French defeat in the Franco-Prussian War, a revolutionary government called the Paris Commune briefly took power in the city. Courbet played an active part and organized a Federation of Artists, which held its first meeting on 5 April in the Grand Amphitheater of the School of Medicine. Some three hundred to four hundred painters, sculptors, architects, and decorators attended. There were some famous names on the list of members, including André Gill, Honoré Daumier, Jean-Baptiste-Camille Corot, Eugène Pottier, Jules Dalou, and Édouard Manet. Manet was not in Paris during the Commune and did not attend, and Corot, who was seventy-five years old, stayed in a country house and his studio during the Commune, not taking part in the political events.

Courbet chaired the meeting and proposed that the Louvre and the Museum of the Luxembourg Palace, the two major art museums of Paris, closed during the uprising, be reopened as soon as possible and that the traditional annual exhibit called the Salon be held as in years past, but with radical differences. He proposed that the Salon should be free of any government interference or rewards to preferred artists; no medals or government commissions would be given. Furthermore, he called for the abolition of the most famous state institutions of French art; the École des Beaux-Arts, the School of Rome, the School of Athens, and the Fine Arts section of the Institute of France.

On 12 April, the Executive Committee of the Commune gave Courbet, though he was not yet officially a member of the Commune, the assignment of opening the museums and organizing the Salon. They issued the following decree at the same meeting: "The Column of the Place Vendôme will be demolished." On 16 April, special elections were held to replace more moderate members of the Commune who had resigned their seats, and Courbet was elected as a delegate for the 6th arrondissement. He was given the title of Delegate of Fine Arts, and on 21 April he was also made a member of the Commission on Education. At the meeting of the Commission on 27 April, the minutes reported that Courbet requested the demolition of the Vendôme column be carried out and that the column would be replaced by an allegorical figure representing the taking of power of the Commune on 18 March.

Nonetheless, Courbet was a dissident by nature, and he was soon in opposition with the majority of the Commune members on some of its measures. He was one of a minority of Commune Members who opposed the creation of a Committee on Public Safety, modeled on the committee of the same name which carried out the Reign of Terror during the French Revolution.

Courbet opposed the Commune on another more serious matter; the arrest of his friend Gustave Chaudey, a prominent socialist, magistrate, and journalist, whose portrait Courbet had painted. The popular Commune newspaper, Le Père Duchesne, accused Chaudey, when he was briefly deputy mayor of the 9th arrondissement before the Commune was formed, of ordering soldiers to fire on a crowd that had surrounded the Hotel de Ville. Courbet's opposition was of no use; on 23 May 1871, in the final days of the Commune, Chaudey was shot by a Commune firing squad. According to some sources Courbet resigned from the Commune in protest.

On 13 May, on the proposal of Courbet, the Paris house of Adolphe Thiers, the chief executive of the French government, was demolished, and his art collection confiscated. Courbet proposed that the confiscated art be given to the Louvre and other museums, but the director of the Louvre refused to accept it. On 16 May, just nine days before the fall of the Commune, in a large ceremony with military bands and photographers, the Vendôme column was pulled down and broke into pieces. Some witnesses said Courbet was there, others denied it. The following day, the Federation of Artists debated dismissing directors of the Louvre and of the Luxembourg museums, suspected by some in the Commune of having secret contacts with the French government, and appointed new heads of the museums.

According to one legend, Courbet defended the Louvre and other museums against "looting mobs", but there are no records of any such attacks on the museums. The only real threat to the Louvre came during "Bloody Week", 21–28 May 1871, when a unit of Communards, led by a Commune general, Jules Bergeret, set fire to the Tuileries Palace, next to the Louvre. The fire spread to the library of the Louvre, which was destroyed, but the efforts of museum curators and firemen saved the art gallery.

After the final suppression of the Commune by the French army on 28 May, Courbet went into hiding in the apartments of different friends. He was arrested on 7 June. At his trial before a military tribunal on 14 August, Courbet argued that he had only joined the Commune to pacify it and that he had wanted to move the Vendôme Column, not destroy it. He said he had only belonged to the Commune for a short period, and rarely attended its meetings. He was convicted, but given a lighter sentence than other Commune leaders; six months in prison and a fine of five hundred Francs. Serving part of his sentence in the prison of Saint-Pelagie in Paris, he was allowed an easel and paints, but he could not have models pose for him. He did a famous series of still-life paintings of flowers and fruit.

Exile and death 

Courbet completed his prison sentence on 2 March 1872, but his problems caused by the destruction of the Vendôme Column were still not over. In 1873, the newly elected president of the Republic, Patrice Mac-Mahon, announced plans to rebuild the column, with the cost to be paid by Courbet. Unable to pay, Courbet went into a self-imposed exile in Switzerland to avoid bankruptcy. In the following years, he participated in Swiss regional and national exhibitions. Surveilled by the Swiss intelligence service, he enjoyed in the small Swiss art world the reputation as head of the "realist school" and inspired younger artists such as Auguste Baud-Bovy and Ferdinand Hodler.

Important works from this period include several paintings of trout, "hooked and bleeding from the gills", that have been interpreted as allegorical self-portraits of the exiled artist. In his final years, Courbet painted landscapes, including several scenes of water mysteriously emerging from the depths of the earth in the Jura Mountains of the France–Switzerland border. Courbet also worked on sculpture during his exile. Previously, in the early 1860s, he had produced a few sculptures, one of which – the Fisherman of Chavots (1862) – he donated to Ornans for a public fountain, but it was removed after Courbet's arrest.

In May 1877, the state set the final cost of reconstructing the Vendôme Column at 323,000 francs for Courbet to repay in annual installments of 10,000 francs for the next 33 years. On 31 December 1877, a day before the first installment was due, Courbet died, aged 58, in La Tour-de-Peilz, Switzerland, of a liver disease aggravated by heavy drinking.

Gallery

Legacy 

Courbet was admired by many younger artists. Claude Monet included a portrait of Courbet in his own version of Le Déjeuner sur l'herbe from 1865–1866 (Musée d'Orsay, Paris). Courbet's particular kind of realism influenced many artists to follow, notably among them the German painters of the Leibl circle, James McNeill Whistler, and Paul Cézanne. Courbet's influence can also be seen in the work of Edward Hopper, whose Bridge in Paris (1906) and Approaching a City (1946) have been described as Freudian echoes of Courbet's The Source of the Loue and The Origin of the World. His pupils included Henri Fantin-Latour, Hector Hanoteau and Olaf Isaachsen.

Courbet once wrote this in a letter:

Courbet and Cubism 

Two 19th-century artists prepared the way for the emergence of Cubism in the 20th century: Courbet and Cézanne. Cézanne's contributions are well-known. Courbet's importance was announced by Guillaume Apollinaire, poet-spokesperson for the Cubists. Writing in Les Peintres Cubistes, Méditations Esthétiques (1913) he declared, "Courbet is the father of the new painters." Jean Metzinger and Albert Gleizes often portrayed Courbet as the father of all modern art.

Both artists sought to transcend the conventional methods of rendering nature; Cézanne through a dialectical method revealing the process of seeing, Courbet by his materialism. The Cubists would combine these two approaches in developing a revolution in art.

On a formal level, Courbet wished to convey the physical characteristics of what he was painting: its density, weight, and texture. Art critic John Berger said: "No painter before Courbet was ever able to emphasize so uncompromisingly the density and weight of what he was painting." This emphasis on material reality endowed his subjects with dignity. Berger observed that the Cubist painters "were at great pains to establish the physical presence of what they were representing. And in this, they are the heirs of Courbet."

Nazi-looted art 
During the Third Reich (1933-1945) Jewish art collectors throughout Europe had their property seized as part of the Holocaust. Many artworks created by Courbet were looted by Nazis and their agents during this period and have only recently been reclaimed by the families of the previous owners.

Courbet's La Falaise d'Etretat was owned by the Jewish collector Marc Wolfson and his wife Erna, who both were murdered in Auschwitz. After disappearing during the Nazi Occupation of France, it reappeared years later at the musée d'Orsay

The great Hungarian Jewish collector Baron Mor Lipot Herzog owned several Courbet artworks, including Le Chateau de Blonay (Neige) (circa 1875, "The Chateau of Blonay (Snow)", now at the Budapest Museum of Fine Arts), and Courbet's most infamous work — L'Origine du monde ("The Origin of the World").  His collection of 2000-2500 pieces was looted by Nazis and many are still missing.

Gustav Courbet's paintings Village Girl With Goat, The Father, and Landscape With Rocks were discovered in the Gurlitt Trove of art stashed in Munich. It is not known to whom they belonged.

Josephine Weinmann and her family, who were German Jews, had owned Le Grand Pont before they were forced to flee. The Nazi militant Herbert Schaefer acquired it and loaned it to the Yale University Art Gallery, against whom the Weinmanns filed a claim.

The French Database of Art Objects at the Jeu de Paume (Cultural Plunder by the Einsatzstab Reichsleiter Rosenberg) has 41 entries for Courbet.

See also
History of painting
Léonce Bénédite
List of Orientalist artists
Lost artworks
Orientalism 
Western painting

Notes

References 

Works cited

Further reading 
Monographs on the art and life of Courbet have been written by Estignard (Paris, 1874), D'Ideville, (Paris, 1878), Silvestre in Les artistes français, (Paris, 1878), Isham in Van Dyke's Modern French Masters (New York, 1896), Meier-Graefe, Corot and Courbet, (Leipzig, 1905), Cazier (Paris, 1906), Riat, (Paris, 1906), Muther, (Berlin, 1906), Robin, (Paris, 1909), Benedite, (Paris, 1911) and Lazár Béla (Paris, 1911). Consult also Muther, History of Modern Painting, volume ii (London, 1896, 1907); Patoux, "Courbet" in Les artistes célèbres and La vérité sur Courbet (Paris, 1879); Le Men, Courbet (New York, 2008).
 Bond, Anthony, "Embodying the Real", Body. The Art Gallery of New South Wales (1997).
 Champfleury, Les Grandes Figures d'hier et d'aujourd'hui (Paris, 1861)
 Chu, Petra ten Doesschate. Courbet in Perspective. (Prentice Hall, 1977) 
 Chu, Petra ten Doesschate and Gustave Courbet. Letters of Gustave Courbet. (Chicago: Univ Chicago Press, 1992) 
 Chu, Petra ten Doesschate. The Most Arrogant Man in France: Gustave Courbet and the Nineteenth-Century Media Culture. (Princeton, NJ: Princeton University Press, 2007) 
 Clark, Timothy J., Image of the People: Gustave Courbet and the 1848 Revolution, (Berkeley: University of California Press, 1999); (Originally published 1973. Based on his doctoral dissertation along with The Absolute Bourgeois: Artists and Politics in France, 1848–1851), 208pp. . (Considered the definitive treatment of Courbet's politics and painting in 1848, and a foundational text of Marxist art history.)
 Faunce, Sara, "Feminist in Spite of Himself", Body. The Art Gallery of New South Wales (1997).
 Griffiths, Harriet & Alister Mill, Courbet's early Salon exhibition record, Database of Salon Artists, 1827–1850
 Howe, Jeffery (ed.), Courbet. Mapping Realism. Paintings from the Royal Museums of Fine Arts of Belgium and American Collections, exhibition catalogue, McMullen Museum of Art, Boston College, 1 September – 8 December 2013 [distributed by the University of Chicago Press]
 Hutchinson, Mark, "The history of The Origin of the World", Times Literary Supplement, 8 August 2007.
 Lemonnier, C, Les Peintres de la Vie (Paris, 1888).
 Lindsay, Jack. Gustave Courbet his life and art. Publ. Jupiter Books (London) Limited 1977.
 Mantz, "G. Courbet," Gaz. des beaux-arts (Paris, 1878)
 Nochlin, Linda, Courbet, (London: Thames & Hudson, 2007) 
 Nochlin, Linda, Realism: Style and Civilization (New York: Penguin, 1972).
 Savatier, Thierry, El origen del mundo. Historia de un cuadro de Gustave Courbet. Ediciones TREA (Gijón, 2009). 
 Tennant Jackson, Jenny, "Courbet's Trauerspiel: Trouble with Women in the Painter's Studio." in G. Pollock (ed.), Visual Politics of Psychoanalysis, London: I.B.Tauris, 2013. 
 Zola, Émile, Mes Haines (Paris, 1879)

External links 

 
 Gustave Courbet papers at the University of Maryland Libraries 
 Gustave Courbet, works at Musée d'Orsay, Paris 
 Joconde, Portail des collections des musées de France
 Union List of Artist Names, Getty Vocabularies. ULAN Full Record Display for Gustave Courbet. Getty Vocabulary Program, Getty Research Institute. Los Angeles, California
 The Painter's Studio (L'atelier du peintre), on-line, in increased reality, Musée d'Orsay
 'Le chef de l'école du laid': Gustave Courbet in 19th-century caricatures. European Studies Blog, British Library.
 Jennifer A. Thompson, "Marine by Gustave Courbet (cat. 948)," in The John G. Johnson Collection: A History and Selected Works, a Philadelphia Museum of Art free digital publication

1819 births
1877 deaths
19th-century French painters
French male painters
French Realist painters
French socialists
Orientalist painters
Légion d'honneur refusals
People from Doubs
People from Riviera-Pays-d'Enhaut District
Deaths from cirrhosis
Communards